Joan Vilar i Costa (1889–1962) was an ecclesiastical writer. He joined the Jesuits and was librarian of the Pontifical Biblical Institute in Rome. Leaving that position, he joined the diocesan clergy.

Costa was born in Manresa.  During the Spanish Civil War, he was a senior official of the government's Propaganda Commission.

In exile he exercised a popular ministry. He died in Toulouse.

He published Als Catalans (1944) which advocated debate and elections for future Catalan national reconstruction.

References

1889 births
1962 deaths
People from Manresa
Spanish people of the Spanish Civil War
20th-century Spanish Jesuits
Spanish librarians
Former Jesuits